Kibbles 'n Bits is a brand name of dog food currently owned by The J.M. Smucker Company since it acquired its previous owner, Big Heart Pet Brands, in 2015. 

The brand was originally created in 1981 as the first dual textured dog food, having soft chewy pieces as well as hard crunchy ones. It was developed by Quaker Oats as part of their Ken'l Ration brand.  In 1985, more bits ingredients were added to the dog food and the brand was renamed "Kibbles 'n Bits 'n Bits 'n Bits."  Their advertising feature a bulldog named Spike that would say "I want my Kibble and Bits."  The addition of more bits and it popular creative ads increased it sales by double its sales estimates. The Lawrence KS plant that manufactured the product was also recognized for its "Go for the Gold" group incentive plan.  

In 1995, Kibbles 'n Bits was acquired by the H.J. Heinz Company, which in turn sold their pet food division to Del Monte Foods later on. It is currently the fifth largest dry dog food brand in the United States. The Lawrence, Kansas plant produces around 1.7 million pounds a day, 9.9 million pounds a week and around 497 million pounds of Kibbles 'n Bits dog food a year.

Kibbles 'n Bits was among several brands recalled in February 2018 due to FDA findings of sodium pentobarbital, a drug used in euthanasia.

References

External links 

 

Products introduced in 1981
Dog food brands
Del Monte Foods brands
Heinz brands
The J.M. Smucker Co. brands
1981 establishments in the United States